Diploglossus garridoi, the Cuban small-eared galliwasp, is a species of lizard of the Diploglossidae family endemic to Cuba.

References

Diploglossus
Reptiles described in 1998
Reptiles of Cuba
Endemic fauna of Cuba
Taxa named by Stephen Blair Hedges